The athletics competition at the  2003 All-Africa Games was held at the Abuja Stadium between 11 and 16 October 2003. The host nation, Nigeria, topped the medal table.

Men's results

Track

Field

Women results

Track

Field

Medal table

Participating nations

 (18)
 (2)
 (11)
 (11)
 (10)
 (4)
 (10)
 (4)
 (2)
 (3)
 (1)
 (4)
 (11)
 (8)
 (36)
 (7)
 (14)
 (2)
 (1)
 (9)
 (29)
 (8)
 (4)
 (1)
 (5)
 (7)
 (9)
 (2)
 (7)
 (3)
 (5)
 (2)
 (67)
 (11)
 (6)
 (4)
 (22)
 (5)
 (14)
 (40)
 (9)
 (5)
 (4)
 (8)
 (7)
 (1)
 (12)

References

Results
GBR Athletics
Unofficial results

 
2003
All-Africa Games
Athletics
2003 All-Africa Games